Thailand has 4,431 kilometers of meter gauge railway tracks not including mass transit lines in Bangkok. All national rail services are managed by the State Railway of Thailand. The four main lines are the Northern Line, which terminates in Chiang Mai, the Northeastern Line, which terminates at Ubon Ratchathani and the Lao border in Nong Khai Province, the Eastern Line, which terminates at the Cambodian border in Sa Kaeo Province, and the Southern Line, which terminates at the Malaysian border in Yala and Narathiwat Provinces.

Current lines 
There are divided into five regional lines:
  Northern Line
  Northeastern Line
  Southern Line
  Eastern Line
  Maeklong Railway

Future lines

Defunct lines

See also

 State Railway of Thailand
 Rail transport in Thailand
 Transport in Thailand
 Burma Railway also known as Death Railway, Thailand–Burma Railway

References

External links
 High speed rail system in Thailand

 
Thailand